John Emms may refer to:

 John Emms (artist) (1844–1912), English painter
 John Emms (chess player) (born 1967), English chess master
 John Victor Emms (1912–1993), English landscape painter